Miellet is a French surname. Notable people with the surname include:

Alexis Miellet (born 1995), French middle-distance runner
Edmond Miellet (1880–1953), French politician

See also
Millet (surname)

French-language surnames